Edward McCallion (born 25 January 1979), commonly known as Eddie McCallion, is a former association football defender from Derry, Northern Ireland.

Club career

Blackburn Rovers
Having played with local Derry and District League club, Oxford United, as a youth from 1995, McCallion was spotted by Blackburn Rovers in 1997 and moved to the English club that same year. Spending just a year at Ewood Park, he never managed to break into the first-team whilst there.

Derry City
McCallion signed for his home town club from Blackburn Rovers in 1998 and made his debut away to Cork City on 6 September 1998. He was the first choice right-back and also performed at centre-back when required.

Dropped from the side for Damian Brennan at the start of the 2005 season, he fought his way back into the team and by the end of the season he was the first choice right-back, helping his club to a second-place finish in the league. He scored an important goal against Kildare County in the FAI Cup that same season and his overlapping runs offered Derry City FC another attacking option.

In 2003, Eddie McCallion had a daughter called Macy

McCallion often deputised in the role of captain when Peter Hutton was absent. McCallion had captained the side on 13 occasions by the end of the 2006 season - one of the most notable of these being Derry City's UEFA Cup First Round 0–0 draw against Paris Saint-Germain at the Brandywell Stadium on 14 September 2006.

McCallion made 52 appearances in all competitions during the 2006 season, the most of any City player that season, and, once again, helped the club finish as runners-up in the league for a second season running, consolidating his position as a firm fan-favourite.

Eddie has three sisters and 4 brothers

Due to his years of service and refusal to let managers move him on, Eddie has acquired hero like status with the Brandywell faithful and is viewed by many fans as the one player who embodies the club values more than any other.

The defender is one of the few brothers to have played in a winning FAI Cup side, as he appeared with brother Tommy in the 2002 final team.

After 14 years, Eddie made his final appearance for Derry against former longtime manager Stephen Kenny's Shamrock Rovers. He came on as a stoppage time substitute to thunderous applause from the Brandywell faithful. He would then join Glenavon on a two-year contract.

Glenavon
McCallion signed for Glenavon on a 2-year deal in July 2012, and made a total of 112 NIFL Premiership appearances for the club.

Bangor
He signed for NIFL Championship One club Bangor in the summer of 2014, and made 5 substitute appearances during the 2014/15 season.

International career
McCallion played for Northern Ireland at schoolboy, youth and under-21 level.

Honours
Derry City
FAI Cup (2): 2002, 2006
League of Ireland Cup (6): 1999–2000, 2005, 2006, 2007, 2008, 2011

Glenavon
Irish Cup (1): 2013–14

References

External links
Player Profile - Official Derry City site

1979 births
Living people
Derry City F.C. players
League of Ireland players
Association footballers from Northern Ireland
Northern Ireland under-21 international footballers
Sportspeople from Derry (city)
Glenavon F.C. players
NIFL Premiership players
Association football defenders